Traverse City West Senior High School (also known as West Senior High, TC West, or simply TCW) is a public, co-educational secondary school located outside Traverse City, Michigan, in neighboring Garfield Township. Along with Traverse City Central High School, TC West is part of the Traverse City Area Public Schools district, and one of six high schools in Traverse City. The school enrolls about 1,600 students each year, making it the largest high school in Michigan north of Kent County.
Since 2008, Traverse City West has offered grades 9 through 12. Additionally, students are given the option to dual enroll and attend classes at Northwestern Michigan College. In addition to the dual enrollment program, a wide variety of honors and AP classes are offered.

History 
Prior to 1997, Traverse City only had one public high school, Traverse City Senior High School, built in 1959 at the base of the Old Mission Peninsula. Until this point, Traverse City Senior High was Michigan's largest high school, with over 3,000 students enrolled annually. A proposal for a new school was brought to the TCAPS board in June 1996, with a number of other proposed names listed, including:

 Traverse City Western High School
 Traverse City West View High School
 Traverse City West Hills High School
 Traverse City Forest View High School

Other proposed school team names were listed in this proposal, too, including:

 Buffaloes
 Cougars
 Eagles
 Highlanders
 Spartans (in honor of the Michigan State Spartans)

A groundbreaking ceremony was held on June 7, 1996, and the new school was finally opened to students on January 26, 1998. Since that time, West Senior High's enrollment has generally encompassed students living west of Division Street. In 2009, a new gymnasium and athletic hub was added to the school.

In 2020, alumnus Chasten Buttigieg, spouse of United States Secretary of Transportation Pete Buttigieg, wrote I Have Something to Tell You. The memoir includes anecdotes about Buttigieg's time at Traverse City West, calling it Traverse City's "hick school", citing the school's tradition of "Bring Your Tractor to School Day".

In 2016 and 2022, the Traverse City West student section, nicknamed the "Bleacher Creatures", won the Battle of the Fans, an MHSAA contest that determines the best student section in the state of Michigan.

In 2022, after 25 years of competing in the Big North Conference, Traverse City West and rival Traverse City Central moved their football programs into the North Division of the Saginaw Valley League.

Principals 
In its history, Traverse City West has had two head principals:

Academics 
Traverse City West offers 132 classes to its students, including 17 AP courses. In addition, students are also given the option to dual-enroll with Northwestern Michigan College. Students can also attend the Career-Tech Center of TBAISD, which offers special technological education for juniors and seniors at West, as those of other districts under TBAISD.

West's student body is divided into three "neighborhoods": Athens, Olympia, and Sparta. These neighborhoods offer smaller learning communities and the chance to form better bonds with their peers and educators.

Demographics 
The demographic breakdown of Traverse City West's 1,544 students enrolled in 2021–22 was:

 Female – 50.2%
 Male – 49.8%
 American Indian/Alaska Native – 1.2%
 Asian – 1.3%
 Black – 0.9%
 Hispanic – 4.1%
 White – 89.4%
 Two or more races – 3.0%

Additionally, 439 students (28.43%) were eligible for reduced-price or free lunch.

Athletics 
Traverse City West's sports teams are known as the Titans. Since 2022, the school has been part of the Blue Division of the Saginaw Valley League for football, and the Big North Conference for other school-sanctioned sports. West is considered a Division-1 and Class A school by MHSAA, meaning it is in the highest enrollment class for the state. West offers the following sports:
Fall sports

 Boys' Soccer
 Boys' Tennis
 Cheerleading
 Cross Country
 Football
 Girls' Golf
 Rowing
 Swimming
 Volleyball

Winter sports

 Basketball
 Wrestling 
 Cross Country Skiing
 Bowling
 Figure Skating
 Hockey
 Skiing

Spring sports

 Baseball
 Boys' Golf
 Equestrian Club
 Girls' Soccer
 Girls' Tennis
 Lacrosse
 Rowing
 Sailing
 Softball
 Track and Field

Sports rivalries

Traverse City Central High School 
Since Traverse City Senior High School split in 1997, there has been a natural rivalry between West and Central. In every year since, the two schools have met at least once every year, with West winning 14 of the 28 games the two schools have played. Since 2012, this annual game has been known as the Traverse City Patriot Game, and honors fallen members of the United States Armed Forces from Northwest Michigan. The winning team is awarded the Nowak-Olson Trophy. In 2020, the game was known as the Celebrate Service Game, and honored frontline workers of the COVID-19 pandemic.

Grand Haven High School 
Traverse City West also has a rivalry with the Buccaneers of Grand Haven High School in Ottawa County. This began in 2016, and has been played as West's second game of the season in every year since. This rivalry began because the two cities are both designated Coast Guard Cities by the United States Coast Guard. The winning team is awarded the Coast Guard Cup. West has won all but one Coast Guard Cup since 2016.

Notable alumni 
Chasten Buttigieg (class of 2007), Former First Gentleman of South Bend, Indiana
Jake Fisher (class of 2011), NFL Player for the Cincinnati Bengals and Buffalo Bills
Eric Gordon (class of 2005), former Michigan State Spartan linebacker
Ryan Hayes (class of 2018), former Michigan Wolverines football player
Darren Keyton (class of 2008), former NFL Player for the Detroit Lions
Phil Thiel (class of 2003), former professional rugby player for Life University
Casey Townsend (class of 2007), Professional Soccer Player for FC Cincinnati
Katie Larson and Savannah Buist of The Accidentals

References

External links 
School website

Traverse City, Michigan
Public high schools in Michigan
Schools in Grand Traverse County, Michigan
Educational institutions established in 1997
1997 establishments in Michigan
School buildings completed in 1998
Traverse City Central-Traverse City West Rivalry